Mohawk Dutch is a now extinct Dutch-based creole language mainly spoken during the 17th century west of Albany, New York in the area around the Mohawk River, by the Dutch colonists who traded with or to a lesser extent mixed with the local population from the Mohawk nation.

At the height of the Republic of the Seven United Netherlands's North American colony of New Netherland, there were 18 languages spoken within Dutch-controlled territory. Dutch settlers frequently married indigenous women, most commonly from the Mohawk, with whom they were strong allies. The resulting children often drifted between the territory of the Iroquois Confederacy and New Netherland, forming among themselves a creole taking elements from both languages.

One lullaby purported to be in Mohawk Dutch was recorded as part of the research for the Dictionary of American Regional English; it is mostly German with one Dutch diminutive suffix (whose German equivalent also occurs), one Dutch word and one word ("baby") that probably comes from a local language.

See also
 Jersey Dutch
 Michif
 Mohawk language
 Pidgin Delaware

References

Dutch-based pidgins and creoles
Dutch language in the Americas
Mohawk culture
Iroquois culture
Extinct languages of North America